"Not Too Late" is a song written by Norah Jones and Lee Alexander, and is a single from Jones's third solo album, Not Too Late (2007). It was released as a radio single in Taiwan in early 2007 (see 2007 in music).

"Not Too Late" was one of the last songs to be recorded for the album. Jones wrote most of the lyrics and the music around early 2005, and Alexander helped her finish it near the end of the recording of the album.

Notes

2007 singles
Norah Jones songs
Songs written by Norah Jones
Songs written by Lee Alexander (musician)
2006 songs
Blue Note Records singles